Gelgel may refer to:
Gelgel, Chad, a city in Chad
Gelgel, Indonesia, a village on the island of Bali, and a former kingdom